Live Your Life may refer to:

 Live Your Life (album), 2003 album by Versailles
 "Live Your Life" (Bomfunk MC's song), 2002
 "Live Your Life" (T.I. song), 2008
 "Live Your Life" from the Tulisa album The Female Boss, 2012
 "Live Your Life" (Yuna song), 2012
 "Live Your Life", song by Mika from Songbook Vol. 1
 "Live Your Life", song by White Lion from Return of the Pride

See also
 Live Your Life Be Free, 1991 album by Belinda Carlisle